True Grit is the soundtrack album by Glen Campbell and Elmer Bernstein for the film True Grit starring John Wayne. Campbell performs on only two of the album's tracks, the first and last while the remaining eight tracks are taken from music composed by Bernstein for the film.

Track listing
Side 1
 "True Grit" (Don Black, Elmer Bernstein) – 2:32 (vocal – Glen Campbell)
 "Rooster" (Elmer Bernstein) – 2:04
 "Mattie and Little Blackie" (Elmer Bernstein) – 2:20
 "A Dastardly Deed" (Elmer Bernstein) – 3:00
 "Papa's Things" (Elmer Bernstein) – 2:58

Side 2
 "True Grit" (Elmer Bernstein) – 2:58
 "Chen Lee and The General" (Elmer Bernstein) – 2:55
 "Big Trail" (Elmer Bernstein) – 3:15
 "Cogburn Country" (Elmer Bernstein) – 2:02
 "True Grit" (Don Black, Elmer Bernstein) – 2:00 (vocal – Glen Campbell)

Personnel
Glen Campbell – vocals (tracks 1 and 10), electric guitar (track 1)
Jim Gordon – drums (track 1)
Max Bennett – bass guitar (track 1)
Gene Estes – percussion (track 1)
Neil LeVang – acoustic Guitar (track 1)
Dennis McCarthy – piano (track 1)

Production
Producer – Neely Plumb
Engineers – Jack Hunt, Don Henderson
Soundtrack music by Elmer Bernstein
Instrumental selections arranged by Artie Butler
Glen Campbell's vocals produced, arranged and conducted by Al De Lory

Charts

Album chart positions

Single chart positions

1969 soundtrack albums
Country music soundtracks
Glen Campbell soundtracks
Capitol Records soundtracks
Soundtrack 1969